Daniel Usvat (born 2 November 1973) is a Romanian former football player who played as a midfielder. Usvat started his career at Bihor Oradea, than played also for Farul Constanța before moving in Hungary where he played the rest of his career, for teams such as: Haladás, Cegléd, Videoton or Lombard Pápa, among others.

References

External links
 
 
 Futballévkönyv 1999 [Football Yearbook 1999], Volume I, Aréna 2000, Budapest: 2000, pp. 78–82. 

1973 births
Living people
Sportspeople from Oradea
Romanian footballers
Association football midfielders
Liga II players
FC Bihor Oradea players
Liga I players
FCV Farul Constanța players
Nemzeti Bajnokság I players
Szombathelyi Haladás footballers
Budapesti VSC footballers
Ceglédi VSE footballers
Nagykanizsai SC footballers
Fehérvár FC players
BFC Siófok players
Lombard-Pápa TFC footballers
Romanian expatriate footballers
Romanian expatriate sportspeople in Hungary
Expatriate footballers in Hungary